Dreisbach is an Ortsgemeinde – a community belonging to a Verbandsgemeinde – in the Westerwaldkreis in Rhineland-Palatinate, Germany.

Geography

The community lies in the Westerwald between Limburg and Siegen. The river Nister, which is part of the river Sieg’s drainage basin flows from east to west through the municipal area. Dreisbach belongs to the Verbandsgemeinde of Bad Marienberg, a kind of collective municipality. Its seat is in the like-named town.

History
In 1252, Dreisbach had its first documentary mention.

Politics

The municipal council is made up of 12 council members who were elected in a majority vote in a municipal election on 7 June 2009.

Economy and infrastructure

Transport
South of the community runs Bundesstraße 255, which leads from Montabaur to Herborn. The nearest Autobahn interchange is Montabaur on the A 3 (Cologne–Frankfurt), some 22 km away. The nearest InterCityExpress stop is the railway station at Montabaur on the Cologne-Frankfurt high-speed rail line.

References

External links
 Dreisbach in the collective municipality’s Web pages 

Municipalities in Rhineland-Palatinate
Westerwaldkreis